{{DISPLAYTITLE:C8H8O6}}
The molecular formula C8H8O6 (molar mass: 200.15 g/mol, exact mass: 200.0321 u) may refer to:

 Fumarylacetoacetic acid
 4-Maleylacetoacetic acid

Molecular formulas